Mimotrysimia albomaculata is a species of beetle in the family Cerambycidae, and the only species in the genus Mimotrysimia. It was described by Breuning in 1948.

References

Lamiini
Beetles described in 1948